Events in the year 1638 in Norway.

Incumbents
Monarch: Christian IV

Events

Births
Mats de Tonsberg, civil servant and timber trader (died 1705).

Deaths

See also

References